The 2021 World Junior Wrestling Championships (U20) were the 44th edition of the World Junior Wrestling Championships and were held in Ufa, Russia between 16 and 22 August.

Medal table

Team ranking

Medal summary

Men's freestyle

Men's Greco-Roman

Women's freestyle

References

World Junior Championships
Wrestling Championships
International wrestling competitions hosted by Russia
Sport in Ufa
Wrestling in Russia
World Junior Wrestling Championships